Complete Singles Collection is the third compilation album by English punk rock band the Anti-Nowhere League. It contains all the non LP releases up to 1995 on one disc.  This album is part of Anagrams punk collectors series.

Track listing
Streets of London
So What
I Hate People
Let's Break the Law
Woman
Rocker
World War III (Live)
For You
Ballad of JJ Decay
Out on the Wasteland
We Will Survive
Queen and Country
So What (Live)
I Hate People (Live)
Snowman (Live)
Fuck Around the Clock (Live)

References

Anti-Nowhere League albums
1995 compilation albums